State Office Building may refer to:

State Office Building (Denver, Colorado), in Civic Center Historic District (Denver, Colorado) (or Denver Civic Center)
State Office Building (Lansing, Michigan), listed on the National Register of Historic Places in Ingham County, Michigan
State Office Building (Binghamton, New York), infamous for a 1981 fire where a transformer explosion contaminated the building with PCBs, leading to a 13-year cleanup effort
Pittsburgh State Office Building, in Pittsburgh, Pennsylvania
State Office Building (Madison, Wisconsin), listed on the National Register of Historic Places in Dane County, Wisconsin
State Office Block, Sydney, former Government Offices in New South Wales

See also
State Tower Building, a 1928 high-rise building located in Syracuse, New York